Daniel Roos is an American engineer, focusing on the technology and policy of transportation systems, and currently the Japan Steel Industry Professor of Civil and Environmental Engineering and Engineering Systems Emeritus at Massachusetts Institute of Technology.

References

External links

Year of birth missing (living people)
Living people
MIT School of Engineering faculty
21st-century American engineers